Iowa Highway 4 (Iowa 4) is a state highway which runs from north to south across the state of Iowa. It continues north as Minnesota State Highway 4. The route was created on January 1, 1969, when several route designations were changed to match other states' route numbers. Before 1969, Iowa 4 was known as Iowa 17.

Route description

Iowa Highway 4 begins at Panora at Iowa 44.  It goes north and is briefly overlapped with Iowa Highway 141 north of Yale.  It continues north until Jefferson, where it intersects U.S. Highway 30 (US 30).  It goes north, then turns west to enter Churdan, then turns north until meeting Iowa 175.  At Iowa 175, the highway turns west, with Iowa 175, passing through Lohrville.  It turns north west of Lohrville, and continues north through Rockwell City, where it intersects US 20.

After crossing US 20 at a diamond interchange, Iowa 4 continues north, and intersects Iowa 7.  They overlap through Pomeroy, then Iowa 4 goes north through Pocahontas, which is where it intersects Iowa 3.  North of Pocahontas, Iowa 4 meets Iowa 10 east of Havelock before passing through Mallard.  Iowa 4 then goes north into Emmetsburg, where it meets US 18.

Iowa 4 and US 18 continue west of Emmetsburg together, then Iowa 4 turns north to go through Graettinger.  Iowa 4 then turns slightly northwesterly to go through Wallingford, before meeting Iowa 9 in Estherville.  Iowa 4 then goes northeasterly out of Estherville before ending at the Minnesota border.

History
Iowa 4 was created on January 1, 1969, during an effort by the Iowa State Highway Commission (IHC) to renumber Iowa's state highways.  The goal of the effort was to reduce confusion among drivers crossing into Iowa from other states by aligning Iowa's route numbers with their adjoining routes in other states.  However, most of the route on which Iowa 4 is now applied has been in the primary highway system since it was created in 1920.

At its designation, Primary Road No. 17 was a much longer route than Iowa 4 is today.  Primary Road No. 17 began in Albia at Primary Road Nos. 8 (now US 34) and 59 (now Iowa 5) and headed northwest through Knoxville and Des Moines.  It continued west and north by passing through Adel and Perry before turning more northerly at Jefferson.  It entered Rockwell City, Pocahontas, Emmetsburg, and Estherville.  It ended at the intersection of Primary Road Nos. 4 (now US 71) and 9 in Spirit Lake.

In 1926, when the U.S. Highway System was introduced, Iowa 17 was shortened on both ends.  A service bulletin from the IHC in late 1925 listed Iowa 17 would begin in Jefferson and follow the same route to Estherville.  However, maps published the highway commission in 1927 show the route extended south to Adel ending at US 6.  By 1931, it had been extended north to the Minnesota state line along what was then Emmet County Road H (CR H).

Ten years later, the southern end of the route shifted west to its current in end Panora, replacing Iowa 150 in its entirety.  The sections that were duplicate routes with US 30, US 169, and Iowa 141 were removed, while the standalone section between Grand Junction and Perry became part of Iowa 144.  Over the next 28 years, sections of Iowa 17 were straightened and the paving of the route was completed.

, construction of a new four-lane expressway for US 20 has caused a portion of that route to be rerouted onto Iowa 4.  The expressway begins eastbound at Iowa 4 and extends across the rest of the state to Dubuque.

Major intersections

References

External links

The Iowa Highways Page by Jason Hancock

004